ABCDEFG is the fourteenth and final studio album by British rock band Chumbawamba. It was officially released on 1 March 2010, but copies that were pre-ordered from the band's website arrived the week before.

Album information 
ABCDEFG continues the five-person line up of Lou Watts, Jude Abbott, Neil Ferguson, Boff Whalley and Phil 'Ron' Moody.
The album's lyrical content focuses mainly on themes to do with music and singing.

"Wagner at the Opera" refers to a concentration camp survivor who disrupted a Wagner recital by swinging a football rattle.  "Torturing James Hetfield" is a response to James Hetfield's approval of the use of Metallica's music as a torture device against Iraqi prisoners at the Guantanamo Bay detention camp. The song was described as depicting a "wonderful image" by Stefan Appleby in BBC Review. Boff Whalley listed the song as one of his favourites in July 2011.  The song "Ratatatay" is about George Melly's experience of being confronted by thugs, who ran off after he recited The Ursonate, a sound poem by Kurt Schwitters.

Track listing

Personnel 
 Chumbawamba: Neil Ferguson, Lou Watts, Boff Whalley, Jude Abbott & Phil Moody
 Ray 'Chopper' Cooper – cello on 3, 5 & 7, harmonica on 12
 Jon Boden – fiddle on 2, 7 & 12
 Belinda O'Hooley – piano on 3, 6 & 7, backing vocals on 3
 Heidi Tidow – backing vocals on 3
 Harry Hamer – cajon on 2, 7 & 15
 Jo Freya – saxophone on 10, 15 & 17
 'Dance, Idiot, Dance' performed by "the massed No Masters Co-operativists" with Lester Simpson on lead vocals
 Brass by Charlie Cake Marching Band, arr. Jude Abbott
 Strings by Whingate Ensemble, arr. Neil Ferguson

References

External links 

ABCDEFG at YouTube (streamed copy where licensed)

2010 albums
Chumbawamba albums
No Masters albums